Acanthoclita is a genus of tortrix moths belonging to the subfamily Olethreutinae and tribe Grapholitini. It was established in 1982 by Alexey Diakonoff.

Species
As of November 2019, the Online World Catalogue of the Tortricidae listed the following species: 
Acanthoclita acrocroca Diakonoff, 1982
Acanthoclita argyrotorna (Diakonoff, 1984)
Acanthoclita balanoptycha (Meyrick, 1910)
Acanthoclita balia Diakonoff, 1982
Acanthoclita bidenticulana (Bradley, 1957)
Acanthoclita conciliata (Meyrick, 1920)
Acanthoclita dejiciens (Meyrick, 1932)
Acanthoclita expulsa Razowski, 2016
Acanthoclita hilarocrossa (Meyrick, in de Joannis, 1930)
Acanthoclita iridorphna (Meyrick, 1936)
Acanthoclita pectinata (Diakonoff, 1988)
Acanthoclita phaulomorpha (Meyrick, 1927)
Acanthoclita trichograpta (Meyrick, 1911)

See also
List of Tortricidae genera

References

Grapholitini
Tortricidae genera
Taxa named by Alexey Diakonoff